John Pinto (born February 28, 1948) is an architectural historian specializing in Renaissance and Baroque Rome. He is the Howard Crosby Butler Memorial Professor of Art and Archaeology, Emeritus at Princeton University.

Education 
Pinto received his B.A. (1970) and Ph.D. (1976) from Harvard University.

Career 
Pinto won the Rome Prize of the American Academy in Rome in 1973. He received the Alice Davis Hitchcock Award of the Society of Architectural Historians in 1996.

Pinto taught at Smith College from 1976 to 1988, and has been at Princeton since then.

Honors
 Fellow (Rome Prize) of the American Academy in Rome
 Ailsa Mellon Bruce Senior Fellow, National Gallery of Art Center for Advanced Study in the Visual Arts, 1984
 Dumbarton Oaks
 Bibliotheca Hertziana
 John Simon Guggenheim Memorial Foundation

Books

 Speaking Ruins: Piranesi, Architects, and Antiquity in Eighteenth-Century Rome, University of Michigan, 2012
 with W. Bruce Lundberg, Steps off the Beaten Path: Nineteenth-Century Photographs of Rome and Its Environs, Charta, 2007
 with Elisabeth Kieven, Pietro Bracci and Eighteenth-Century Rome: Drawings for Architecture and Sculpture in the Canadian Centre for Architecture and Other Collections, Pennsylvania State University Press, 2001.
 with William L. MacDonald, Hadrian’s Villa and Its Legacy, Yale, 1995
 The Trevi Fountain, Yale, 1986.

References

External links
 Official site at Princeton
 Curriculum vitae (pdf)

1948 births
Living people
American art historians
Harvard University alumni
Princeton University faculty
Smith College faculty